Burley Castle, more commonly called Alstoe, was to the north of the village of Burley, two miles north-east of Oakham in the county of Rutland, .  Alstoe was the name of a hundred.

It was originally used as a Saxon moot (c.7th century-11th century). There is doubtful evidence of a small motte and bailey castle of the late 11th or early 12th century (between 1086 and 1153).  Only earthworks remain.

References

Castles in Rutland